Don't ask, don't tell (1993-2011) is a common name for U.S. military's sexual orientation policy.

Don't Ask, Don't Tell may also refer to:

Film and TV
 Don't Ask Don't Tell (film), a 2002 comedy film
 "Don't Ask, Don't Tell" (Roseanne), a 1994 episode of Roseanne
 "Don't Ask, Don't Tell" (Ugly Betty), a 2007 episode of Ugly Betty

Music
 Don't Ask, Don't Tell (album), a  1994 album by Come
 "Don't Ask, Don't Tell", a song by Chelsea Grin from Evolve
 "Don't Ask Don't Tell", a song by Everglow from Last Melody
 "Don't Ask, Don't Tell", a song by Tove Lo from Blue Lips

See also
Don't Ask, a 1994 album by Australian singer Tina Arena
 Don't Ask, Don't Tell Repeal Act of 2010, a 2010 legislation to repeal the policy
 Don't Ask Me (disambiguation)